First Presbyterian Church, also known as the Church of Christ, Scientist, is a historic Presbyterian church located at 111 W. Ash Street in Goldsboro, Wayne County, North Carolina. It was built in 1856, and is a one-story, stuccoed, temple form Greek Revival architecture style church.  It features an in antis portico with Tuscan order columns and low pitched roof with a painted wooden cupola. In 1953, the building was sold to the Christian Science Society.

It was listed on the National Register of Historic Places in 1979.

References

External links
Official website

Former Presbyterian churches in the United States
Christian Science churches in North Carolina
Presbyterian churches in North Carolina
Churches on the National Register of Historic Places in North Carolina
Greek Revival church buildings in North Carolina
Churches completed in 1856
19th-century Presbyterian church buildings in the United States
Churches in Wayne County, North Carolina
Goldsboro, North Carolina
National Register of Historic Places in Wayne County, North Carolina